Haroula Rose is an American director, writer, producer and musician. She is best known for her work on Once Upon a River, As They Slept and Lost & Found.

Life and career
Rose was born in Chicago, Illinois. She holds a BA and MA degrees from the University of Chicago.

Rose's debut feature film, Once Upon a River, premiered at the Bentonville Film Festival, presented at many film festivals across the world and won the Efebo d'Oro. Her pilot, Lost & Found, premiered at the 2017 Tribeca Film Festival. It also won the Audience Award at the Bentonville Film Festival.

Filmography

Discography
 2009 - EP Someday
 2011 - These Open Roads
 2013 - EP So Easy
 2016 - Here the Blue River (Thirty Tigers)
 2020 - Grass Stains Acoustic EP

References

External links
 
 

Living people
American film directors
American women film directors
American women film producers
21st-century American women musicians
American women screenwriters
Year of birth missing (living people)